The 2013 Alabama Hammers season was the third season for the professional indoor football franchise and their second in the Professional Indoor Football League (PIFL). The Hammers were of seven teams that competed in the PIFL for the 2013 season.

The team played their home games under head coach Dean Cokinos at the Von Braun Center in Huntsville, Alabama. The Hammers earned a 9–2 record, placing first in the league, winning PIFL Cup II 70–44 over the Richmond Raiders.

Schedule
Key:

Regular season
All start times are local to home team

Postseason

Roster

Division standings

References

External links
2013 results

Alabama Hammers
Alabama Hammers
Alabama Hammers